The 1964–65 Coupe de France was its 48th edition. It was won by Stade Rennais which defeated UA Sedan-Torcy in the Final.

Round of 16

Quarter-finals

Semi-finals

Final

References

French federation

1964–65 domestic association football cups
1964–65 in French football
1964-65